The  Eastern League season began on approximately April 1 and the regular season ended on approximately September 1. 

The Vermont Reds defeated the New Britain Red Sox three games to one to win the Eastern League Championship Series.

Regular season

Standings

Notes:
Green shade indicates that team advanced to the playoffs
Bold indicates that team advanced to ELCS
Italics indicates that team won ELCS

Playoffs

Semi-finals Series
New Britain Red Sox defeated Waterbury Indians 3 games to 1.

Vermont Reds defeated Albany/Colonie Yankees 3 games to 1.

Championship Series
Vermont Reds defeated New Britain Red Sox 3 games to 1.

Attendance

References

External links
1985 Eastern League Review at thebaseballcube.com

Eastern League seasons